Vsevolod Illarionovich Pudovkin (16 February 1893 – 30 June 1953) was a Russian and Soviet film director, screenwriter and actor who developed influential theories of montage. Pudovkin's masterpieces are often contrasted with those of his contemporary Sergei Eisenstein, but whereas Eisenstein utilized montage to glorify the power of the masses, Pudovkin preferred to concentrate on the courage and resilience of individuals. He was granted the title of People's Artist of the USSR in 1948.

Biography
Vsevolod Pudovkin was born in Penza into a Russian family, the third of six children. His father Illarion Epifanovich Pudovkin came from peasants of the Penza Governorate, the village of Shuksha and worked in several companies as a manager and a door-to-door salesman. Vsevolod's mother Elizaveta Alexandrovna Pudovkina (née Shilkina) was a housewife.

A student of engineering at Moscow University, Pudovkin saw active duty during World War I, being captured by the Germans. During this time he studied foreign languages and did book illustrations. After the war, he abandoned his professional activity and joined the world of cinema, first as a screenwriter, actor and art director, and then as an assistant director to Lev Kuleshov.

In 1924, he married Anna Zemtsova. Pudovkin asserted that his wife encouraged him for pursuing a career as a filmmaker.

His first notable work was a comedy short Chess Fever (1925) co-directed with Nikolai Shpikovsky. José Raúl Capablanca played a small part in it, with a number of other cameos presented. In 1926 he directed what would become one of the masterpieces of silent movies: Mother, where he developed several montage theories that would make him famous. Both movies featured Pudovkin's wife Anna Nikolaevna Zemtsova in supporting female parts (she left cinema shortly after).

His first feature was followed by The End of St. Petersburg (1927), and Storm Over Asia (also known as The Heir of Genghis Khan), titles which compose a trilogy at the service of the bolshevik revolutionary policy.

In 1928, with the advent of sound film, Pudovkin, Sergei Eisenstein and Grigori Aleksandrov signed the Manifest of Sound, in which the possibilities of sound are debated, and always understood as being in a state of tension and nonsynchronization with the image. This idea would be brought to bear in his next pictures: A Simple Case (1932) and The Deserter (1933), works that do not match the quality of earlier work.The Heir to Genghis Khan (or Storm over Asia; 1928). Pudovkin was publicly charged with formalism for his experimental sound film A Simple Case, which he was forced to release without its sound track. In 1935 he was awarded the Order of Lenin.

After an interruption caused by health concerns, Pudovkin returned to movie making, this time with a number of historical epics: Victory (1938); Minin and Pozharsky (1939) and Suvorov (1941). The last two were often praised as some of the best movies based on Russian history, along with the works of Sergei Eisenstein. Pudovkin was awarded a Stalin Prize for both of them in 1941.

During World War II he was evacuated to Kazakhstan where he directed several patriotic war movies. He also played a small part in the Ivan the Terrible movie (as God's fool). With the end of war he returned to Moscow and continued his work at the Mosfilm studio, making biographical and war movies. In 1947 he was awarded another Stalin Prize for his work on Admiral Nakhimov, and in 1950 — his second Order of Lenin and a third Stalin Prize for Zhukovsky. His last work was The Return of Vasili Bortnikov (1953).

Apart from directing, screenwriting and acting, Pudovkin was also an educator and a journalist, author of several books on film theory, professor at VGIK, president of the cinema section at VOKS (since 1944) and a member of the Soviet Peace Committee.

Vsevolod Pudovkin died on 30 June 1953 in Jūrmala, Latvian SSR (near Riga) after a heart attack. He was buried at the Novodevichy Cemetery. One of the streets in Moscow is named after Pudovkin (see Pudovkin street).

Filmography

Published works
 Film Technique and Film Acting Grove Press. 1958.

References

External links

 
 
 The silent revolutionary: Jonathan Jones on the work of Vsevolod Pudovkin, at Guardian Unlimited
 Islands. Vsevolof Pudovkin documentary by Russia-K, 2005 (in Russian)
 Vsevolod Pudovkin. Imprisoned by Time documentary by Russia-K, 2008 (in Russian)
 Legends of World Cinema documentary by Russia-K, 2014 (in Russian)

1893 births
1953 deaths
People from Penza
People from Penzensky Uyezd
Communist Party of the Soviet Union members
Film theorists
Male screenwriters
Russian film directors
Russian male film actors
Russian male silent film actors
Russian male writers
20th-century Russian screenwriters
20th-century Russian male writers
Silent film directors
Soviet film directors
Soviet male film actors
Soviet screenwriters
Moscow State University alumni
Gerasimov Institute of Cinematography alumni
Academic staff of the Gerasimov Institute of Cinematography
Russian military personnel of World War I
People's Artists of the USSR
Stalin Prize winners
Recipients of the Order of Lenin
Recipients of the Order of the Red Banner